Terrance Roberson (born December 30, 1976) is an American former professional basketball player. At 6'7", he played as a small forward.

Roberson played at California State University, Fresno, averaging 16.3 points per game during his senior season (1999–2000).  In 2000, he was selected by the Idaho Stampede in the third round of the Continental Basketball Association draft. 
Although never drafted by a National Basketball Association team, he signed as a free agent and appeared in three games for the Charlotte Hornets of the NBA in 2000 (his only time in the NBA). In those three games, Roberson played a total of 12 minutes and recorded 1 assist, 1 rebound but no points. His final game was on November 29, 2000 in a 103 - 79 win over the Toronto Raptors where he recorded 1 turnover and no other stats.
He last played for the Halifax Rainmen during the 2011 season.

References

External links
NBA stats @ basketballreference.com
NBA D-League profile

1976 births
Living people
African-American basketball players
American expatriate basketball people in Canada
American expatriate basketball people in Finland
American expatriate basketball people in France
American expatriate basketball people in Israel
American expatriate basketball people in Italy
American expatriate basketball people in Mexico
American expatriate basketball people in Romania
American expatriate basketball people in Switzerland
American expatriate basketball people in Turkey
American expatriate basketball people in Ukraine
American men's basketball players
Basketball players from Michigan
BC Kyiv players
Charlotte Hornets players
CSU Sibiu players
Fresno State Bulldogs men's basketball players
Galgos de Tijuana (basketball) players
Greenville Groove players
Halifax Rainmen players
Huntsville Flight players
Maccabi Haifa B.C. players
Pallacanestro Reggiana players
Parade High School All-Americans (boys' basketball)
SAM Basket players
Sportspeople from Saginaw, Michigan
Small forwards
Trenton Shooting Stars players
Undrafted National Basketball Association players
21st-century African-American sportspeople
20th-century African-American sportspeople